HD 142527 is a binary star system in the constellation of Lupus. The primary star belongs to the Herbig Ae/Be star class, while the companion, discovered in 2012, is a red dwarf star or accreting protoplanet with a projected separation of less than 0.1″. The system is notable for its circumbinary protoplanetary disk and its discovery has helped refine models of planet formation. The orbit of companion is strongly inclined to the circumbinary protoplanetary disk.

HD 142527 is listed in the International Variable star index as a UX Orionis variable, with a visible-light magnitude ranging from 8.27 to 8.60.

Protoplanetary disk
HD 142527 is an extremely young star system, aged about 1 million years old so it retains its protoplanetary disk, which has a mass of 15% of the Sun and a diameter of 980 AU.

Studies have shown eddies and vortex structures forming in the disk under the influence of  two large planets. The system is important as it allows astronomers to observe the accretion process in planetary formation. 

In early 2013 an article was published by astronomers working with the ALMA telescope in Chile, which refers to the discovery of two massive flows of matter in the system. Dust and gas is transferred from the periphery to the center through gravitational interaction with two giant planets that have a mass several times greater than the mass of Jupiter. Thus, the flows act as "pumps", pumping material from the edge of the center, "feeding" star. The planets themselves have not been detected so far, due to a dense shroud of gas. However, astronomers have proposed models that describe their existence.
	
Japanese astronomers have discovered particles of ice in the disk.

References

Lupus (constellation)
Binary stars
Herbig Ae/Be stars
142527
078092
CD-41 10447
Circumstellar disks
J15564188-4219232
F-type giants